Apostolos or Apostolis (Αποστόλης) is a common male Greek given name, which means "apostle". The diminutive form Tolis (Τόλης) is also common. Bearers of the name include:

Apostolis Anthimos
Apostolos Athanassakis
Apostolos Doxiadis
Apostolos Gerasoulis
Apostolos Giannou
Apostolos Gkountoulas
Apostolos Grozos
Apostolos Kaklamanis
Apostolos Kathiniotis
Apostolos Kontos
Apostolos Liolidis
Apostolos Nanos
Apostolos Nikolaidis (athlete)
Apostolos Nikolaidis (singer)
Apostolos Papandreou
Apostolos Paraskevas
Apostolos Prantzos
Apostolos Santas
Apostolos Tsianakas
Apostolos Vellios
Metropolitan Apostolos of Kilkis
Metropolitan Apostolos II of Rhodes
Tolis Voskopoulos
Nikolis Apostolis, naval commander of the Greek War of Independence
 Greek ship Apostolis, Greek warships named after him

Greek masculine given names